Lake Dystos (Greek: Λίμνη Δύστος is a natural lake located on the central part of the island of Euboea, southeast of the Aliveri. People have populated the shores of the lake since the Neolithic period. The homonymous town that is located nearby, thrived in the Classical and Hellenistic periods.

See also
List of lakes in Greece

References

Lakes of Greece
Euboea